Tony Ferrino Baker (born June 11, 1964) is a former professional American football running back. He was drafted by the Atlanta Falcons in the tenth round of the 1986 NFL Draft. He played college football at East Carolina.

Baker also played for the Cleveland Browns, Phoenix Cardinals and Frankfurt Galaxy.

References

1964 births
Living people
American football running backs
Atlanta Falcons players
Cleveland Browns players
East Carolina Pirates football players
Frankfurt Galaxy players
Phoenix Cardinals players
Players of American football from North Carolina
Sportspeople from High Point, North Carolina